Roads of Destiny is a story collection by O. Henry, published in 1909. There are twenty-two stories.

Contents 
 "Roads of Destiny"
 "The Guardian of the Accolade"
 "The Discounters of Money"
 "The Enchanted Profile"
 "Next to Reading Matter"
 "Art and the Bronco"
 "Phoebe"
 "A Double-dyed Deceiver"
 "The Passing of Black Eagle"
 "A Retrieved Reformation"
 "Cherchez la Femme"
 "Friends in San Rosario"
 "The Fourth in Salvador"
 "The Emancipation of Billy"
 "The Enchanted Kiss"
 "A Departmental Case"
 "The Renaissance at Charleroi"
 "On Behalf of the Management"
 "Whistling Dick's Christmas Stocking"
 "The Halberdier of the Little Rheinschloss"
 "Two Renegades"
 "The Lonesome Road"

References

American short story collections
Short story collections by O. Henry
1909 short story collections